Dave Vitkay (born May 22, 1980) is an American mixed martial artist currently competing in the Welterweight division. A professional competitor since 2002, he has formerly competed for Bellator MMA.

Background
Born and raised in the suburbs of Detroit, Michigan, Vitkay competed in ice hockey and baseball growing up. He began training in martial arts and MMA upon moving to Atlanta, Georgia, where he also works as a trainer.

Mixed martial arts career

Early career
Vitkay began training in mixed martial arts at the age of 20 and made his professional debut in 2002. Vitkay compiled an overall record of 11-12-1 before being signed by Bellator.

Bellator MMA
Vitkay was expected to make his Bellator debut on February 7, 2013 against then-undefeated Kelvin Tiller at Bellator 88. However, Tiller failed to make weight and the fight was subsequently cancelled.

Vitkay made his Bellator debut on March 21, 2013 at Bellator 93 against Jesse Peterson. Vitkay won the fight via technical submission due to a guillotine choke, just 18 seconds into the first round.

Vitkay was then expected to face Brennan Ward at Bellator 98 on September 7, 2013. However, Vitkay was removed from the event after Ward was called to replace Andreas Spång against Justin Torrey in the quarterfinals of the Bellator season nine middleweight tournament at the same event.

Vitkay faced Tyson Jeffries at Bellator 101 on September 27, 2013. Vitkay won via third-round rear-naked choke submission.

In his next appearance, Vitkay faced Keith Berry at Bellator 116 on April 11, 2014. Vitkay won via unanimous decision.

Mixed martial arts record

|-
|Loss
|align=center|18-13-1
|Jeremie Holloway
|TKO (punches)
|LFA 8: Hamilton vs. Bazzi
|
|align=center|1
|align=center|2:55
|Greenville, South Carolina, United States
|
|-
|Win
|align=center|18-12-1
|Jared Gooden
|Decision (unanimous)
|NFC 86
|
|align=center|3
|align=center|2:44
|Atlanta, Georgia, United States
|Won NFC Welterweight Championship.
|-
|Win
|align=center|17–12–1
|Cody Wilson
|Decision (unanimous)
|Legacy FC 53
|
|align=center|3
|align=center|5:00
|Atlanta, Georgia, United States
|
|-
|Win
|align=center|16–12–1
|Wesley Barnes
|TKO (injury)
|Legacy FC 47
|
|align=center|2
|align=center|5:00
|Atlanta, Georgia, United States
|Welterweight debut.
|-
|Win
|align=center|15–12–1
|Tommy Jones
|Submission (straight armbar)
|Legacy FC 40
|
|align=center|3
|align=center|2:44
|Duluth, Georgia, United States
|
|-
|Win
|align=center|14–12–1
|Keith Berry
|Decision (unanimous)
|Bellator 116
|
|align=center|3
|align=center|5:00
|Temecula, California, United States
|
|-
|Win
|align=center|13–12–1
|Tyson Jeffries
|Submission (rear-naked choke)
|Bellator 101
|
|align=center|3
|align=center|3:07
|Portland, Oregon, United States
|
|-
|Win
|align=center|12–12–1
|Jesse Peterson
|Technical Submission (guillotine choke)
|Bellator 93
|
|align=center|1
|align=center|0:18
|Lewiston, Maine, United States
|
|-
|Win
|align=center|11–12–1
|Adam Dehart
|Submission (guillotine choke)
|Wild Bill's Fight Night 48
|
|align=center|2
|align=center|4:24
|Duluth, Georgia, United States
|
|-
|Loss
|align=center|10–12–1
|Brett Chism
|KO (punches)
|Wild Bill's Fight Night 44
|
|align=center|1
|align=center|3:58
|Duluth, Georgia, United States
|
|-
|Loss
|align=center|10–11–1
|Kendrick Miree
|KO (punch)
|K.O. Kings: King of the Ring 5
|
|align=center|1
|align=center|3:22
|Atlanta, Georgia, United States
|
|-
|Win
|align=center|10–10–1
|Roger Carroll
|Decision (unanimous)
|Sportfight X: Atlanta
|
|align=center|3
|align=center|5:00
|Atlanta, Georgia, United States
|
|-
|Draw
|align=center|9–10–1
|Warren Thompson
|Draw
|BFN 7: Showdown at Center Stage
|
|align=center|3
|align=center|5:00
|Atlanta, Georgia, United States
|
|-
|Win
|align=center|9–10
|Warren Thompson
|Submission (rear-naked choke)
|SportFight X 1: Beatdown
|
|align=center|2
|align=center|3:38
|Atlanta, Georgia, United States
|
|-
|Loss
|align=center|8–10
|Brett Chism
|KO (punches)
|Wild Bill's Fight Night 22
|
|align=center|1
|align=center|3:18
|Duluth, Georgia, United States
|
|-
|Loss
|align=center|8–9
|Jesse Forbes
|TKO (punches)
|Wild Bill's Fight Night 19
|
|align=center|1
|align=center|2:05
|Duluth, Georgia, United States
|
|-
|Win
|align=center|8–8
|Todd Carney
|Submission (guillotine choke)
|Wild Bill's Fight Night 17
|
|align=center|2
|align=center|0:37
|Atlanta, Georgia, United States
|
|-
|Win
|align=center|7–8
|Steve Sawyer
|Submission (guillotine choke)
|Wild Bill's Fight Night 16
|
|align=center|1
|align=center|0:30
|Duluth, Georgia, United States
|
|-
|Loss
|align=center|6–8
|Scott Harper
|Decision (split)
|ISCF: Return of the Kings
|
|align=center|3
|align=center|5:00
|N/A
|
|-
|Loss
|align=center|6–7
|James Damien Stelly
|TKO
|Xtreme Freestyle Fighting 3
|
|align=center|1
|align=center|N/A
|Columbus, Georgia, United States
|
|-
|Win
|align=center|6–6
|Todd Seyler
|TKO (doctor stoppage)
|H2H: Hand 2 Hand Combat
|
|align=center|1
|align=center|N/A
|Canton, Ohio, United States
|
|-
|Loss
|align=center|5–6
|Ron Fields
|TKO (punches)
|Freestyle Fighting Championships 12
|
|align=center|2
|align=center|N/A
|Indiana, United States
|
|-
|Loss
|align=center|5–5
|Michael Patt
|Submission (armbar)
|Freestyle Fighting Championships 10
|
|align=center|1
|align=center|3:14
|Tunica, Mississippi, United States
|
|-
|Win
|align=center|5–4
|Jason Braswell
|Submission (guillotine choke)
|Freestyle Fighting Championships 10
|
|align=center|1
|align=center|0:25
|Tunica, Mississippi, United States
|
|-
|Win
|align=center|4–4
|Leo Sylvest
|Submission (rib injury)
|Freestyle Fighting Championships 10
|
|align=center|2
|align=center|1;11
|Tunica, Mississippi, United States 
|
|-
|Loss
|align=center|3–4
|Lance Everson
|Decision (unanimous)
|CZ 7: Gravel Pit
|
|align=center|2
|align=center|5:00
|Revere, Massachusetts, United States 
|
|-
|Loss
|align=center|3–3
|Hector Ramirez
|TKO (punches)
|GC 26: FightFest 1
|
|align=center|1
|align=center|1:38
|California, United States
|
|-
|Loss
|align=center|3–2
|Joe Riggs
|KO (punches)
|ICC: Trials 2
|
|align=center|1
|align=center|N/A
|Minnesota, United States 
|
|-
|Win
|align=center|3–1
|George Crawford
|Submission (guillotine choke)
|Dangerzone 26: Professional Level Cage Fighting
|
|align=center|1
|align=center|4:39
|Osceola, Iowa, United States
|
|-
|Win
|align=center|2–1
|Tyrone Roberts
|KO (punches)
|Dangerzone 26: Professional Level Cage Fighting
|
|align=center|1
|align=center|4:05
|Osceola, Iowa, United States
|
|-
|Win
|align=center|1–1
|Doug Sauer
|TKO (punches)
|ROF 9: Eruption
|
|align=center|2
|align=center|N/A
|Baraboo, Wisconsin, United States
|
|-
|Loss
|align=center|0–1
|Mike Mackenzie
|Submission (rear-naked choke)
|TFC 6: Fightzone 6
|
|align=center|2
|align=center|N/A
|Toledo, Ohio, United States
|

References

Living people
1980 births
American male mixed martial artists
Middleweight mixed martial artists
Mixed martial artists from Michigan